USS Wenonah is a name used more than once by the U.S. Navy:

 , a  patrol vessel, was built in 1915 at Neponset, Massachusetts.
 , a harbor tugboat constructed during the winter of 1940 and 1941 at Morris Heights, New York.

References 

United States Navy ship names